Several Canadian naval units have been named HMCS Chaudiere.

  (I) was a River-class destroyer originally commissioned as  until transfer to the Royal Canadian Navy in 1943.
  (II) was a  escort that served in the Royal Canadian Navy and the Canadian Forces during the Cold War.

Battle honours
Atlantic 1944
Normandy 1944
Biscay 1944

Royal Canadian Navy ship names